Quartey is a surname of Ga origin.

Notable people with the surname include:

Sportspeople
 Ike Quartey, former WBA welterweight champion boxer
 Clement Quartey, former Ghanaian boxer
 Jonathan Quartey, Ghanaian football player
 Laud Quartey, Ghanaian football player
 Lê Văn Tân (born Jonathan Quartey), Vietnamese - Ghanaian football striker
 Ebenezer Quartey, Ghanaian runner who competed in Men's 400 metres at the 1964 Summer Olympics
 Michael Quartey, former Ghanaian football player for FC Biel-Bienne

Others
 Benjamin Quartey-Papafio, a physician and politician in the Gold Coast (now Ghana), the first Ghanaian to obtain the degree of M.D.
 Ian Jones-Quartey, American animator and graphic artist of Ghanaian descent
 David K. Henderson-Quartey, a historian and author of The Ga of Ghana : history & culture of a West African people (2002)
 Yolanda Quartey, vocalist for English country/soul band Phantom Limb
 Ama Amissah Quartey, 2003 Miss Earth Ghana, represented Ghana at Miss Earth 2003
 Kwei Quartey, novelist, author of Wife of the Gods (2009)

Surnames of Ga origin